Nicholas Nickleby is a British television series which first aired on the BBC in 1957. It is based on the novel Nicholas Nickleby by Charles Dickens.

Broadcast live, all ten episodes were recorded, but are now considered lost.

Cast
 William Russell as Nicholas Nickleby (10 episodes)
 Jennifer Wilson as Kate Nickleby (10 episodes) 
 Malcolm Keen as Ralph Nickleby (9 episodes)
 Richard Wordsworth as Newman Noggs (9 episodes)
 Gillian Lind as Mrs. Catherine Nickleby (8 episodes)
 Brian Peck as Smike (8 episodes)
 Esmond Knight as Wackford Squeers. Sr (6 episodes)
 Rosamund Greenwood as Miss La Creevy (5 episodes)
 George Howe as Mr. Charles Cheeryble (5 episodes)
 Keith Davis as Wackford Squeers. Jr (4 episodes)
 Barry Foster as Frank Cheeryble (4 episodes)
 Anthony Jacobs as Arthur Gride (4 episodes)
 Lyn James as Madeline Bray (4 episodes)
 Bartlett Mullins as Tim Linkinwater (4 episodes)
 Douglas Wilmer as Sir Mulberry Hawk (4 episodes)
 Graham Crowden as Mr. Pyke (3 episodes)
 Fabia Drake as Madame Mantalini (3 episodes)
 Roddy Hughes as Mr. Ned Cheeryble (3 episodes)
 Fay Compton as Mrs. Squeers (2 episodes) 
 Rosalind Knight as Miss Fanny Squeers (2 episodes)

References

Bibliography
 Michael Pointer. Charles Dickens on the Screen: The Film, Television, and Video Adaptations. Scarecrow Press, 1996.

External links
 

BBC television dramas
1957 British television series debuts
1957 British television series endings
1950s British drama television series
English-language television shows
Television series set in the 19th century
Television shows based on works by Charles Dickens